Billboard Top Hits: 1979 is a compilation album released by Rhino Records in 1991, featuring 10 hit recordings from 1979.

The track lineup includes six songs that reached the top of the Billboard Hot 100 chart, including the No. 1 song of 1979, "My Sharona" by The Knack. The remaining four songs each reached the top five on the Hot 100. The album was certified Gold by the RIAA on July 16, 1996.

Track listing

Track information and credits were taken from the CD liner notes.

References 

1991 compilation albums
Billboard Top Hits albums
Rhino Records compilation albums